The Vissai Ninh Bình Football Club, also known as Vissai Ninh Bình, was a professional football club based in Ninh Bình, Vietnam. The club played in V.League 1 from 2010 to 2014, when the club withdrew from the league due to a match-fixing scandal.

The team played at Ninh Bình Stadium.

History

Hồ Chí Minh City Police FC
Ho Chi Minh City Police F.C. were a Vietnamese football club based in Ho Chi Minh City. They were champions in the 1995 season of the V-League, Vietnam's top-level association football league. They placed as runners-up in the 1993–94, 1996, 1999–2000, and 2001–02 seasons. Star striker Lê Huỳnh Đức, who later went on to lead Đà Nẵng F.C. to win the 2009 V-League championship as manager, played for the club from 1992 through 2000. In 1998, the team played a nationally televised friendly match against the semi-professional San Francisco Bay Seals, winning 3–1. The match marked the first time an American professional soccer team had played in post-war Vietnam.

Vissai Ninh Bình FC

Match-fixing scandal
During the 2014 season, Vissai Ninh Bình wrote to the Vietnam Football Federation (VFF) and to the Vietnam Professional Football Joint Stock Company to withdraw from the league due to 13 players being involved in match fixing. They had played eight league matches and were third from bottom at the time. Following their withdrawal from the league, all their results were declared null and void.

Honours

National competitions
League
V.League 1
 Winners:       1995
 Runners-up:  1993–94, 1996, 1999–2000, 2001–02
V.League 2
 Winners: 2009
Cup
Vietnamese National Cup
 Winners: 1998, 2001, 2013
 Runners-up:  2000
Vietnamese Super Cup
 Winners: 2013
 Runners-up:  1999, 2001

Performance in AFC competitions

Record as V.League member

References

External links
Ninh Binh Football Fan Club

 
Association football clubs established in 2007
Football clubs in Vietnam